The Big Red is the eighteenth studio album by Australian country music artist John Williamson. It was released in January 2012 and peaked at number 15 on the ARIA Charts. It was the first all-original album in almost four years for Williamson. The album was supported with a national tour.

Singles
 "Hang My Hat in Queensland" was released in December 2011 as the album's lead single. It's an autobiographical song that follows his life from the Mallee region in Victoria, on to Sydney and up to Queensland where he and partner Meg live part of the year in the Gold Coast hinterland. Williamson sings of his love of their mountain retreat in this land of mangoes and warm beaches in June and July.
 "The Big Red" was released in July 2012 as the album's second single. Williamson said "That's just about being in the city and wanting to get out and I think it's one of those songs that bush people will get into more than anything."
 "Prairie Hotel Parachilna" video was released in December 2012, with the digital single being released in January 2013. The song was written after a trip to the South Australian pub.

Reception
98.9 FM reviewed The Big Red as the album of the week saying "There are twelve tracks on this release, not one that doesn't stand up to the quality that the iconic songwriter is known for. Each one is crafted perfectly and sure to become chants, wedding first dance tracks or songs to belt out amongst friends and family around the fire, lounge room or penthouse apartment."

Track listing

Charts

Weekly charts

Year-end charts

Release history

References

2012 albums
John Williamson (singer) albums
Warner Music Group albums